Mariana Verkerk is a Dutch-American model, runway coach, agent, television personality, businesswoman, and commercial producer. She has walked the runway for various designers, such as Michael Kors, Nicole Miller, and Thierry Mugler. Since 2005, Mariana has served as a judge and runway coach on the TV shows Scandinavia's Next Top Model, Norway's Next Top Model (cycle 7), Benelux' Next Top Model, and Holland's Next Top Model.

Early life and discovery 
Mariana Verkerk was born in 1960 and raised in Schiedam, a city outside of Rotterdam, The Netherlands. She started working for an American shipping company at the age of 16. Verkerk started modeling at age 20 after being convinced to go to New York City by a fashion journalist.

As soon as she arrived in New York City, she met with numerous agencies. All of them rejected her, claiming that she was too old - she was 21 at the time. Mariana returned to the Netherlands, and a few months later, she chose to return to New York City. Her career took off after a young fashion designer asked her to walk the runway for him..

Career

Modeling 

After signing with Elite Model Management, Verkerk worked with supermodels such as Naomi Campbell, Kate Moss, and Tyra Banks.

As a model, Mariana travelled all over the world to walk fashion shows for Michael Kors, Nicole Miller, Thierry Mugler, Carolina Herrera, Bill Blass, Victoria's Secret, Bogner, Maidenform, Escada, Gloria Vanderbilt, Paloma Picasso, Halston, Zang Toi, Akris, and Anne Cole.

Mariana has appeared on the cover and inside pages of Elle, Vogue, Harper's Bazaar, Paper, and Forbes.

Coaching 

In 1983, Elite Model Management started Elite Model Look, an annual event to discover new female fashion models. Mariana was asked to prepare the new fashion talents for the runway.

Verkerk became a runway coach for Model Search America (now Mogull Talent), which at the time was one of the largest scouting companies in the US. During the course of ten years attended conventions and gave motivational speeches across the country. Over the years, she has taught tens of thousands of people how to walk the runway.

Television 

In 2005, Mariana became the Posing Coach and a jury member for Scandinavia's Next Top Model, and later for Norway's Next Top Model, Benelux Next Top Model, and Holland's Next Top Model. During that time, she also appeared in other Dutch programs such as Atlas and ‘Jouw vrouw/Mijn vrouw VIPS’.

Expeditie Robinson a.k.a. Dutch Survivor 
Mariana joined the show for the 20th anniversary, which took place in the Philippines in 2019. In 20 Mariana competed in the All-Star edition of Expeditie Robinson which aired in the spring of 2022. Mariana was a semifinalist in both seasons.

The Model Convention 
Her role as a judge and coach in Hollands Next Top Model made Mariana the ‘Queen of the Catwalk’ in The Netherlands. She received hundreds of messages a day from boys and girls who wanted to become a model. This is how the idea of The Model Convention was born in 2008. The Model Convention brings agencies such as Women, Wilhelmina, Ford Models USA, Donna Models Tokyo, Storm London, and many more together in Amsterdam. Undiscovered talent can attend the event for an opportunity to be scouted by one of the agencies. The Model Convention takes place once a year at the ‘Huishoudbeurs’.

Producing 
Since 2009, Mariana produces and choreographs fashion shows all over the world. Her contributions across the globe include China Fashion Week, New York Fashion Week, Los Angeles Fashion Week and Amsterdam Fashion Week. Verkerk has also produced commercials for brands like McDonald's, FBTO, Rabobank, and Marie Stella Maris. Furthermore, Mariana was responsible for the U.S. production of American singer-songwriter Matt Simons’ music video for the song "Catch & Release".

References 

1960 births
Living people
American people of Dutch descent